Shiraz is a city in Iran.
Shiraz may asso refer to:

Places
 Shiraz (electoral district), a constituency for the Islamic Consultative Assembly
 Shiraz, East Azerbaijan, a village in Iran
 Shiraz County, an administrative subdivision of Iran
 Vosketap, Armenia, formerly called Shiraz

People
 Hovhannes Shiraz (1915–1984), Armenian poet
 Ara Shiraz (1941–2014), Armenian sculptor
 Estee Shiraz, American-Israeli entrepreneur, communication expert and mediator
 Sipan Shiraz (1967–1997), Armenian poet
 Shiraz Adam
 Shiraz Ali (born 1934), former Bermudian cricketer
 Shiraz Minwalla (born 1973), Indian string theorist
 Shiraz Shariff (born 1954), politician from Alberta, Canada
 Shiraz Shivji (born 1947), computer designer
 Shiraz Sumar (born 1950), East African cricketer
 Shiraz Tal (born 1974), Israeli model and actor
 Ghalib Shiraz Dhalla (born 1978), Los Angeles-based writer
 Shiraz (singer) (born 1983), Lebanese singer

Others
 Shiraz (band), a South African group from the 1980s
 Shiraz (film), a 1928 silent film
 Shiraz (grape), a synonym for the syrah variety
 Shiraz (ship), a FPSO vessel formerly named HMAS Westralia (O 195)
 Shiraz University, Shiraz, Iran
 Shiraz wine, produced around the town of Shiraz, Iran
 Shiraz, another name for the Persian cat breed

See also
 Shirazi (disambiguation)